Mikhail Kuzmin (born August 5, 1955, in Sverdlovsk) is a Russian political figure and  a deputy of the 8th State Duma. He was the mayor of Stavropol from 1991 to 2001.

From 1980, he worked as an engineer of a group of projects to organize work in the Ministry of Agriculture and Food. Two years later, he was appointed the first secretary of the Oktyabrsky district committee Komsomol of Stavropol. From 1990 to 1991, he worked first as deputy and then as First Deputy Chairman of the Stavropol City Executive Committee. From 1991 to 2001, he was the mayor of Stavropol. In 1997-2016, Kuzmin was the deputy of the Duma of the Stavropol Oblast. On March 11, 2007, he was elected to the State Duma of the Stavropol Oblast of the 4th convocation. In 2016, he became deputy of the State Duma of the 7th convocation. Since September 2021, he has served as deputy of the 8th State Duma.

Awards  

 Order of Honour

References

1955 births
Living people
United Russia politicians
21st-century Russian politicians
Mayors of places in Russia
Eighth convocation members of the State Duma (Russian Federation)
Seventh convocation members of the State Duma (Russian Federation)